The 1956 Iowa State Cyclones football team represented Iowa State College of Agricultural and Mechanic Arts (later renamed Iowa State University) in the Big Seven Conference during the 1956 NCAA University Division football season. In their third and final year under head coach Vince DiFrancesca, the Cyclones compiled a 2–8 record (0–6 against conference opponents), finished in last place in the conference, and were outscored by their opponents by a combined total of 260 to 92. They played their home games at Clyde Williams Field in Ames, Iowa.

The team's regular starting lineup on offense consisted of left end Brian Dennis, left tackle Oliver Sparks, left guard Ron Bredeson, center Frank Powell, right guard Ralph Losee, right tackle Andris Poncius, right end Gale Gibson, quarterback Charles Martin, left halfback Jack Hansen, right halfback Bob Harden, and fullback Marv Walter. Chuck Muelhaupt and Oliver Sparks were the team captains.

The team's statistical leaders included Bob Harden with 244 rushing yards and 24 points (four touchdowns), Phil Hill with 205 passing yards, and John Scheldrup with 140 receiving yards. No Iowa State players were selected as first-team all-conference players.

Schedule

References

Iowa State
Iowa State Cyclones football seasons
Iowa State Cyclones football